Rebecca Sorensen (born December 28, 1972) is an American skeleton racer who has competed since 2002. Her best World Cup finish was 18th in the women's event at Park City, Utah in November 2009.

References

1972 births
American female skeleton racers
Living people
Place of birth missing (living people)
21st-century American women